Heliocopris antenor is a species of beetles of the family Scarabaeidae.

Description
The body is glossy and the coloration varies from dark brown to black.

Distribution
This species occurs in Senegal and Guinea-Bissau

References
 Universal Biological Indexer
 Biolib

External links
 Galerie insecte

antenor
Beetles described in 1789